Harjinder Singh (born 16 March 1970, in Punjab) is a former Indian footballer and coach who played and coached all his career for Jagatjit Cotton & Textile Football Club (JCT FC) in the I-League.

Career

Jagatjit Cotton & Textile Football Club
In 1989, Singh joined JCT FC which then only played at state level. In 1997, he led them  to the first ever NFL title ever.

As an All India Football Federation member
On 2 September 2022, Singh was elected as a member of the technical committee of the All India Football Federation.

Honours

India
SAFF Championship: 1993

India U20
 AFC Asian U-19 Championship: 1974

References

Indian footballers
1970 births
Living people
People from Kapurthala district
Footballers from Punjab, India
Association football defenders
India international footballers